Colobothea parcens is a species of beetle in the family Cerambycidae. It was described by Bates in 1881. It is known from Belize, Guatemala, Honduras and Mexico.

References

parcens
Beetles described in 1881